Live at Shea Stadium: The Concert is the fifth live album as well as a CD and DVD music compilation of songs performed by American singer/songwriter Billy Joel during two concerts at Shea Stadium in New York City on July 16 and 18 of 2008. It was released on March 8, 2011. The film was produced by Jon Small, Joel's former bandmate in the 1960s groups The Hassles and Attila. The film aired on PBS as part of Great Performances.

The two concerts were the last performed at Shea Stadium before it was demolished to make way for Citi Field. It features guest appearances by Tony Bennett, Garth Brooks, John Mayer, Steven Tyler, Roger Daltrey, John Mellencamp, Mark Wood, and Paul McCartney.

Pete Flynn was a Shea groundskeeper who did the improbable by driving the Beatles from the stage to a centerfield gate in 1965, then driving Paul McCartney from the stadium's rear entrance to the stage to perform at Billy Joel's "Last Play at Shea" concert 43 years later.

Track listing
All songs written by Billy Joel except "Take Me Out to the Ball Game" (Jack Norworth and Albert Von Tilzer), and "Let It Be" "A Hard Day’s Night" and "I Saw Her Standing There" (Lennon–McCartney).

Disc one
"Prelude/Angry Young Man" - 5:45
"My Life" - 5:30*
"Summer, Highland Falls" - 3:42
"Everybody Loves You Now" - 3:05
"Zanzibar" - 5:36
"New York State of Mind" (with Tony Bennett) - 6:49
"Allentown" - 3:51
"The Ballad of Billy the Kid" - 5:41
"She's Always a Woman" - 3:45
"Goodnight Saigon" - 7:23
"Miami 2017 (Seen the Lights Go Out on Broadway)" - 4:20
"Shameless" (with Garth Brooks) - 4:54
"This Is the Time" (with John Mayer) - 6:16
"Keeping the Faith" - 5:06

 The CD version of "My Life" has an alternative introduction ("Yankee Doodle Dandy") from the DVD.

Disc two
"Captain Jack" - 7:20
"Lullabye (Goodnight, My Angel)" - 3:43
"The River Of Dreams"/ "A Hard Day’s Night" - 7:43
"We Didn't Start the Fire" - 5:14
"You May Be Right" - 4:53
"Scenes from an Italian Restaurant" - 7:40
"Only The Good Die Young" - 4:13
"I Saw Her Standing There" (with Sir Paul McCartney) - 4:06
"Take Me Out to the Ball Game" - 0:45
"Piano Man" - 5:53
"Let It Be" (with Sir Paul McCartney) - 5:11

DVD
"Prelude/Angry Young Man"
"My Life"
"Summer, Highland Falls"
"Everybody Loves You Now"
"Zanzibar"
"New York State of Mind" (with Tony Bennett)
"Allentown"
"The Ballad of Billy the Kid"
"She's Always A Woman"
"Goodnight Saigon"
"Miami 2017 (Seen the Lights Go Out on Broadway)"
"Shameless" (with Garth Brooks)
"This is the Time" (with John Mayer)
"Keeping the Faith"
"Captain Jack"
"Lullabye (Goodnight my Angel)"
"The River of Dreams"/"A Hard Day's Night"
"We Didn't Start the Fire"
"You May Be Right"
"Scenes From an Italian Restaurant"
"Only the Good Die Young"
"I Saw Her Standing There" (with Sir Paul McCartney)
"Take Me Out to the Ballgame"
"Piano Man"
"Let It Be" (with Sir Paul McCartney)

In addition to the above, the DVD of the concert offers three extra performances: "Walk This Way" with Steven Tyler, "My Generation" with Roger Daltrey and "Pink Houses" with John Mellencamp.

Credits 
 Billy Joel – lead vocals, grand piano, keyboards, harmonica
 David Rosenthal – keyboards, grand piano, organ, backing vocals 
 Tommy Byrnes – guitars, music director 
 Mark Rivera – guitars, saxophone, flute, backing vocals 
 Crystal Taliefero – guitars, percussion, saxophone, backing vocals 
 Andy Cichon – bass, backing vocals 
 Chuck Burgi – drums 
 Carl Fischer – saxophones, trumpet

Certifications

References

Billy Joel live albums
2011 live albums
2011 video albums
Columbia Records live albums
Columbia Records video albums